Dartchery at the 1972 Summer Paralympics consisted of three events.

Medal summary

References 

 

1972 Summer Paralympics events
1972